Jules Michelet was an armoured cruiser of the French Navy, laid down in 1904 and completed in 1908. It served during the First World War being eventually sunk as a target in 1937.

Description
Jules Michelet was laid down in June 1904 as a modified version of the  class of armoured cruisers. The ship was fitted with four funnels.

The main armament was four  guns in twin turrets, one each fore and aft, while secondary armament was twelve  guns, eight of which were in single turrets and the remaining four in casemates. Although Jules Michelet had four fewer 164 mm guns than the Leon Gambetta class, with single turrets instead of twin turrets, both the main and secondary guns were more powerful models than those carried in the earlier ships. A tertiary anti-torpedo-boat battery of twenty four  guns was mounted in casemates. The ship's armament was completed by two submerged  torpedo tubes.

History

After entering service, Jules Michelet was assigned to the cruiser squadron of the Mediterranean Fleet, based in Toulon. On 27 June 1912, Jules Michelet suffered two gun explosions during firing practice at Toulon, killing four and wounding 21. These explosions were blamed on defective powder.

World War I
During the First World War, Jules Michelet was part of the Mediterranean Fleet, spending the whole of the war in the Mediterranean. The French ships, along with a flotilla of twelve destroyers, were to steam to Philippeville on 4 August, but the German cruisers had bombarded the port the previous day. This attack, coupled with reports that suggested the Germans would try to break out of the Mediterranean into the Atlantic, prompted the French high command to send Jules Michelet and the First Light Division further west, to Algiers to block the Germans.

After the German ships escaped to Constantinople, rather than attack the French troop transports from North Africa as had been expected, the French turned to address the next naval threat: the Austro-Hungarian Navy in the Adriatic Sea. Edgar Quinet joined the rest of the French fleet in its blockade of the Adriatic, based out of Navarino. The fleet, commanded by Admiral Augustin Boué de Lapeyrère, had assembled by the night of 15 August; the following morning, it conducted a sweep into the Adriatic and encountered the Austro-Hungarian cruiser . In the ensuing Battle of Antivari, Zenta was sunk, with no losses on the French side. The French fleet then withdrew due to the threat of Austro-Hungarian U-boats in the area.

Twelve of Jules Michelets 47 mm guns were removed during the war, replaced by four anti-aircraft guns of similar size. She took place in the evacuation of the Serbian army from Corfu to Bizerta in 1915 and later supported Allied operations in the Salonika campaign. Following the signing of the Armistice of Mudros, ending the participation of Turkey in the First World War, Jules Michelet was deployed through the Dardanelles into the Black Sea in November 1918.

Later career
Jules Michelet went on a brief tour of French Indochina in 1922–1923 with the armoured cruiser . The pair left France on 12 October 1922, arriving on 19 April 1923. They cruised East Asian waters until 10 May when they departed for France, which they reached on 11 July. Jules Michelet was deployed to Indochina for a lengthier stay as the flagship of the Far East squadron in the late 1920s; she left France on 15 June 1925 and arrived in July. She remained there until May 1929, when she was replaced by Waldeck-Rousseau. Jules Michelet returned to France on 10 July 1929, after which she was paid off and placed in reserve. She was disarmed the following year and was used as a barracks ship at Toulon. The ship was later used as a target ship for aircraft and submarines, being sunk by the submarine Thetis in 1937.

Footnotes

References

 

 

 The Times History of the War: Vol. XXI. London, 1920.

External links
Set of drawings of Jules Michelet

Cruisers of the French Navy
Ships built in France
1905 ships
World War I cruisers of France
Ships sunk as targets
Maritime incidents in 1937